Drakes Creek is an unincorporated community in Madison County, in the U.S. state of Arkansas.

The community takes its name from nearby Drakes Creek.

References

Unincorporated communities in Madison County, Arkansas